Emma Brown Garrett is a former Australian actress who worked in Indian Bollywood and Tollywood Bengali movies.  She made her Indian film debut in the Bengali movie Shukno Lanka. Her Bollywood movies are Yamala Pagla Deewana and Dum Maro Dum. Along with English, she also speaks Hindi and is also a trained dancer.

Garrett is an alumna of the National Institute of Dramatic Art. She works as a real estate agent and auctioneer.

Filmography

References

External links

Living people
Actresses from Sydney
Australian film actresses
National Institute of Dramatic Art alumni
Actresses in Hindi cinema
Actresses in Bengali cinema
Australian expatriate actresses in India
21st-century Australian actresses
Year of birth missing (living people)